Torre Maura is an underground station of Line C of the Rome Metro. It is located at the intersection between the Via Casilina, Via dell'Aquila Reale and Via Walter Tobagi, near the Grande Raccordo Anulare. The stop serves the area of Torre Maura and provides an interchange with the Tobagi station on the Rome-Giardinetti railway.

Construction of the station started in 2007; it was opened on 9 November 2014.

References

External links

Rome Metro Line C stations
Railway stations opened in 2014
2014 establishments in Italy
Railway stations in Italy opened in the 21st century